Isaac White was born around 1756 in Prince William County, Virginia. He was an American Mining Geologist who was in charge of the Salt Works in Equality, Illinois. He was initiated as a Freemason in September 1811. He was a close friend to Gov. William Henry Harrison of the Northwest Territory, and to Joseph Hamilton Daveiss, U.S. District Attorney for Kentucky. Like Daveiss, he answered Gov. Harrison's call for volunteers to march on Tecumseh's village at Prophetstown.

White was a colonel in the Illinois militia. Gov. Harrison declined the offer of Illinois troops. Col. White therefore enlisted as a private in the  Indiana dragoons, which had been placed under the command of Daveiss, who had also volunteered for Indiana service. At Fort Vincennes the two exchanged swords. Both were killed at the Battle of Tippecanoe in 1811, where they were buried in a common grave.

Place names
White County, Illinois
White County, Indiana

See also
Jo Daviess County, Illinois

References

External links
Story of Isaac White

1770s births
1811 deaths
People of Illinois Territory
People of pre-statehood Illinois